Microdon ruficrus (Williston 1887), the spiny-shield ant fly, is an uncommon species of syrphid fly observed in the eastern United States and adjacent Canada. Hoverflies can remain nearly motionless in flight. The adults are also known as flower flies for they are commonly found on flowers from which they get both energy-giving nectar and protein-rich pollen. Larvae have been found from the nests of Lasius alienus.

References

Diptera of North America
Hoverflies of North America
Insects described in 1887
Microdontinae